Ričardas Šileika (born 3 April 1968 in Atkočiai, Ukmergė) is a Lithuanian writer, essayist and photographer.

Bibliography

Poetry
Kalvaratas (1992)
Audivi (1997)
Metraščiai (1998)

Essays
Ričardo Šileikos vardo provincija nr. 345 (2003).

External links
 Rasytojai.lt: About the author
 Tekstai.lt: Poems

Lithuanian writers
Lithuanian male poets
Lithuanian essayists
Living people
1968 births